The women's 200 metre individual medley event at the 2016 Summer Olympics took place on 8–9 August at the Olympic Aquatics Stadium.

Summary
Another medley double happened for the sixth straight time, as Hungary's Katinka Hosszú pulled away from the field to collect her third individual Olympic gold at these Games. Leading from the start, she threw down a gold-medal time in 2:06.58 to establish a new Olympic record, and to hold off a charging Great Britain's Siobhan-Marie O'Connor by three tenths of a second. Unable to catch the Hungarian towards a sprint finish, O'Connor produced a new British record of 2:06.88 to take home the silver. Meanwhile, U.S. swimmer Maya DiRado added a bronze to her runner-up prize from the 400 m individual medley three days earlier with a time of 2:08.79, edging out her teammate Melanie Margalis (2:09.21) to fourth by almost half a second.

Australia's Alicia Coutts, silver medalist from London 2012, culminated her Olympic career with a fifth-place time in 2:10.88, and was shortly followed in sixth by Canadian swimmer Sydney Pickrem (2:11.22). Russia's Viktoriya Andreeva (2:12.28), and defending gold medalist Ye Shiwen of China (2:13.56) closed out the field.

Hosszú also posted an Olympic record in 2:07.45 to lead all swimmers on the morning prelims, clipping 0.12 seconds off the previous mark set by Ye Shiwen in London four years earlier.

In the medal ceremony, the medals for the competition were presented by Pál Schmitt, Hungary, IOC member, and the gifts were presented by Mohamed Diop, Senegal, Bureau Member of FINA.

Records
Before this competition, the existing world and Olympic records were as follows.

The following records were established during the competition:

Competition format

The competition consisted of three rounds: heats, semifinals, and a final. The swimmers with the best 16 times in the heats advanced to the semifinals. The swimmers with the best 8 times in the semifinals advanced to the final. Swim-offs were used as necessary to break ties for advancement to the next round.

Results

Heats

Semifinals

Semifinal 1

Semifinal 2

Final

References

Women's 00200 metre individual medley
Olympics
2016 in women's swimming
Women's events at the 2016 Summer Olympics